Anyone for Denis? is a British video-taped television version of the stage play of the same name broadcast by the ITV network on 28 December 1982. The original play, first performed at the Whitehall Theatre in 1981, was written by satirist John Wells.

It is based on Private Eye's 'Dear Bill' letters, purportedly written by Denis Thatcher, the husband of Margaret Thatcher, the prime minister at the time. Set in Chequers, the play parodies the couple's relationship.  The title is a punning reference to the more familiar question "Anyone for tennis?"

The television production, for Thames Television was directed by Dick Clement and stars John Wells, Angela Thorne, John Cater and Nicky Henson.

Cast
 John Wells ...  Denis Thatcher
 Angela Thorne ...  Margaret Thatcher
 John Cater ...  Maurice Picarda
 Nicky Henson ...  Vouvrey
 Mark Kingston ...  Hamilton Thisp
 Roy Kinnear ...  Boris
 Alfred Molina ...  Eric
 John Nettleton ...  Jenkins
 Terence Rigby ...  Major
 Joan Sanderson ...  Rear Admiral
 Robert Stephens ...  Schubert

References

1982 plays
1982 television films
1982 films
Films about Margaret Thatcher
ITV comedy
Television series by Fremantle (company)
British television plays
Television shows produced by Thames Television
Films directed by Dick Clement
1980s English-language films